Ampara Military Base is a military base located in close to the Ampara, Eastern Province of Sri Lanka. The Sri Lanka Army Medical Corps maintains a base hospital in Ampara.

References

Sri Lankan Army bases
Buildings and structures in Ampara District